"Poor Me" is a single released by English singer Adam Faith. On 10 March 1960, it reached number one in the UK Singles Chart, staying there for two weeks.

Song profile
"Poor Me" was released when the previous single, "What Do You Want?", was still at number two in the UK Singles Chart. The song was originally rejected by several music publishers in its original incarnation as "Poor Man". It was felt by some that Faith and Barry contrived a backing and singing style that leaned too heavily on the style of Buddy Holly, and "Poor Me" was likened to his hit single, "Heartbeat".

References

External links
Adam Faith website  

1960 songs
1960 singles
UK Singles Chart number-one singles
Adam Faith songs
Songs with music by John Barry (composer)
Songs written by Les Vandyke
Parlophone singles

Song recordings produced by John Burgess